Pepijn van Houwelingen (born 24 February 1980) is a Dutch politician, who has been serving as a member of the House of Representatives since the 2021 general election. He is a member of the conservative populist party Forum for Democracy (FvD). Van Houwelingen holds a doctorate and has worked for the Netherlands Institute for Social Research for a decade.

While a member of parliament, Van Houwelingen received media attention for several controversial statements with regards to his opposition to globalist ideas and the government's measures to mitigate COVID-19 pandemic.

Early life and career 
Van Houwelingen was born in 1980 in the Overijssel city Enschede and grew up in its Helmerhoek neighborhood with his three sisters and one brother. He attended the gymnasium of the secondary school Jacobus College starting in 1992 and studied industrial engineering at the University of Twente from 1998 until 2002. Van Houwelingen subsequently did another master's in (philosophy of) economics and another bachelor's in Japanese studies at the same time at Erasmus University Rotterdam. He moved to Japan in 2004 to study at the Hiroshima City University and obtained his PhD in 2009 after finishing his dissertation titled Social capital in Japan.

After finishing his studies, Van Houwelingen worked for half a year in demand and supply management at Canon Europe in Amstelveen. In February 2010, he took a job as a scientific assistant specialized in citizen participation at the Netherlands Institute for Social Research, a government agency, where he remained employed until he became an MP.

Politics 
While working at the Netherlands Institute for Social Research, Van Houwelingen voiced his opposition to what he perceived as the growing power of the European Union (EU). He also wrote that he favored direct democracy with referendums and that he supported decentralization.

Van Houwelingen was one of the initiators of  Burgercomité-EU (EU citizen committee), which aims to make decisions surrounding the EU more democratic. After a law was passed that made it possible to trigger an advisory referendum, the organization cooperated with GeenStijl and Forum for Democracy to get a referendum on the approval of the European Union–Ukraine Association Agreement. The referendum was held in 2016 after enough signatures had been collected, and Burgercomité-EU campaigned against the agreement. Van Houwelingen also co-authored a manifesto opposing it. A few weeks after the referendum, NRC Handelsblad revealed that a novel by Van Houwelingen had been published in 2010 under the pseudonym Vossius. The book's main character argues in favor of city-states, discrimination of minorities, oppression of women, and the abolition of human rights, and he calls the EU the source of many evils.

At the end of 2019, Van Houwelingen was involved in the establishment of the broadcasting corporation Ongehoord Nederland (Unheard Netherlands), which would become part of the Dutch public broadcasting system. Van Houwelingen was a guest during its first broadcast on 22 February 2022.

Forum for Democracy MP 
In the 2021 general election, Van Houwelingen was Forum for Democracy's eighth candidate. He was elected, receiving 430 preference votes, and was sworn into the House of Representatives on 31 March 2021. Van Houwelingen became the FvD's spokesperson for the European Union, referendums, social affairs, and public health. Finances and economic affairs were added to his specialities when three Forum for Democracy MPs left the party in May 2021. He is a member of the Committees for Agriculture, Nature and Food Quality; for European Affairs; for Finance; for Health, Welfare and Sport; for the Interior; and for Petitions. While a House member, Van Houwelingen argued against scale-ups and mergers in the public sector, and an essay by him about the issue called  (Microphobia) was published by Forum for Democracy's scientific institute in 2021. His position led him to voice his opposition to the proposed merger of the municipalities of Scherpenzeel and Barneveld. Van Houwelingen also opposed the power and influence held by supranational organizations such as the European Union, the World Health Organization, and the World Economic Forum, considering it to be a globalist power grap. In 2022, he introduced a bill in the House together with party leader Thierry Baudet to reintroduce consultative referendums comparable to those organized in Switzerland.

During a legislative meeting in April 2021 about a mandatory quarantine for travelers returning to the Netherlands because of the COVID-19 pandemic, he called the measure totalitarian and compared its reasoning to that of the persecution of Jews during World War II. In November 2021, comments by Van Houwelingen during a House debate again stirred controversy. When Sjoerd Sjoerdsma (D66) asked him to distance himself from comparisons between measures to limit the spread of the coronavirus and the persecution of Jews, Van Houwelingen told him "Your time will come, because there will be tribunals." in reference to Sjoerdsma's support of the government's COVID-19 policy, which he described as criminal. He clarified after an adjournment that his statements were not intended as a personal threat to Sjoerdsma but that he does believe major crimes were being committed, which warrant an investigation. Later that day, Speaker of the House Vera Bergkamp wrote that threats and intimidation of any form are completely unacceptable and that she wanted a dialogue with the parliamentary groups about debate manners. A motion by Van Houwelingen in December to rule out a vaccine mandate did not receive support from a House majority even though a majority opposed such a mandate at the time.

In September 2022, Van Houwelingen posted a picture on Twitter of Ministers Ernst Kuipers and Karien van Gennip raising a flag of the United Nation's Sustainable Development Goals (SDGs) alongside the same picture where the flag had been replaced by the one of Nazi Germany. It was accompanied by the caption "The facade and reality". Both cabinet members filed a criminal complaint, and D66 parliamentary group leader Jan Paternotte pled for Van Houwelingen to be suspended as a House member through a complaint to the Board of Inquiry on Integrity for endangering the ministers. Van Houwelingen removed his social media post in favor of another one with the same image where the SDGs flag had been replaced by a communist hammer and sickle flag, stating this was a more appropriate comparison. He did not apologize for his original tweet but did call it possibly inappropriate and clumsy. The Public Prosecution Service announced a criminal investigation for libel in December.

Personal life 
Van Houwelingen has children and a Japanese wife, and he is a resident of The Hague.

Bibliography 
 (2010, Aspekt)  (Not contemporary) under the pseudonym Vossius
 (2015, Blue Tiger)  (Manifesto to the people of the Netherlands) with Arjan van Dixhoorn
 (2021, Renaissance Instituut)  (Microphobia: The cult of the colossal)

References

External links 
 Pepijn van Houwelingen, Houseofrepresentatives.nl

1980 births
Living people
21st-century Dutch politicians
Erasmus University Rotterdam alumni
Forum for Democracy (Netherlands) politicians
Members of the House of Representatives (Netherlands)
University of Twente alumni
Dutch anti-vaccination activists
21st-century Dutch civil servants
21st-century social scientists
Dutch social scientists
21st-century Dutch novelists